Anastasia "Natasa" Gkotzi (born April 4, 1987) is a Greek professional basketball player who plays for Olympiacos. She was also member of the Greece women's national basketball team in the 2015 Eurobasket.

References

External links 
 Eurobasket.com profile
 FIBA 2015 Eurobasket Women profile

Living people
Greek women's basketball players
Olympiacos Women's Basketball players
1987 births
Basketball players from Patras
Guards (basketball)